Frederick George (Fred) Creba (1945–2013) was a New Zealand Paralympic sportsperson. In the 1976 Summer Paralympics he competed in athletics and weightlifting, winning a bronze medal in the Weightlifting in men's light heavy weight, despite being from a town of only 3 thousand.

Creba died in 2013 when he was 68 years old.  In 1975, his sporting performances, including setting a world record in weightlifting, earned him the title, "South Canterbury Sportsperson of the Year and was the first disabled person to do so."

Fred Creba trained in the Toc - H gym which in reality was just a set of equipment in a small garage. He would practice discus throw by going out with his father and sometimes his nephew and take one throw his father would then go and retrieve and start over. Freddy's wit and toughness enabled him to go from a tiny town in the middle of nowhere to a Paralympic bronze medal and for that he has become a role model to me and for many others inspiring the average person to never give up and to not let your disables define you.

References

External links 
 
 

Athletes (track and field) at the 1976 Summer Paralympics
Weightlifters at the 1976 Summer Paralympics
Paralympic bronze medalists for New Zealand
1945 births
2013 deaths
Medalists at the 1976 Summer Paralympics
Paralympic medalists in weightlifting
Paralympic weightlifters of New Zealand